Filippo Ercolani (died 1535) was a Roman Catholic prelate who served as Bishop of Alatri (1530–1535) and Administrator of Alatri (1528–1530).

Biography
On 20 Apr 1528, Filippo Ercolani was appointed during the papacy of Pope Clement VII as Administrator of Alatri until the appointment of Antonio Maria Ciocchi del Monte on 4 Feb 1530.
Ciocchi del Monte resigned soon after and on 1 Jul 1530, Ercolani was appointed by Pope Clement VII as Bishop of Alatri.
On 10 Jul 1530, he was consecrated bishop by Andrea della Valle, Cardinal-Priest of Santa Prisca. 
He served as Bishop of Alatri until his resignation in 1535.

References

External links and additional sources
 (for Chronology of Bishops) 
 (for Chronology of Bishops)  

16th-century Italian Roman Catholic bishops
Bishops appointed by Pope Clement VII
1535 deaths